Il Liberatore ('The Liberator') was an Italian language underground publication issued by the Italian section of the Tunisian Communist Party. Il Liberatore appeared in 1935, after the antifascist weekly Domani had been banned. The manager was Silvano Bensasson and editor was Michele Rossi, two well-known Italian anti-fascists.

References

1935 establishments in Tunisia
Communist newspapers
Communism in Tunisia
Defunct newspapers published in Tunisia
Italian language newspapers published in Tunisia
Publications established in 1935
Publications with year of disestablishment missing